Otothyris is a genus of armored catfishes endemic to Brazil.

Species
There are currently four recognized species in this genus:
 Otothyris juquiae Garavello, Britski & Schaefer, 1998
 Otothyris lophophanes (Eigenmann & Eigenmann, 1889)
 Otothyris rostrata Garavello, Britski & Schaefer, 1998
 Otothyris travassosi Garavello, Britski & Schaefer, 1998

Distribution
The genus Otothyris is distributed along the Atlantic coast of Brazil between Barra do Ribeira, Guaíba River Basin of Rio Grande do Sul State in the south to the Jequitinhonha River Basin of Bahia State in the north. The species are apparently restricted to the lowland sections of these river systems near the coast and have not been collected further to the west in higher elevation or headwater streams.

Description
Otothyris species have a laterally-placed eye that does not have an iris diverticulum. The head and margin of the snout have enlarged odontodes arranged in dorsal and lateral series. The pectoral skeleton is completely exposed from below and bears strong odontodes. The supraoccipital has paired anterior odontode crests and a posterior midline crest.

Immature specimens of Otothyris species, as in most species of the Hypoptopomatinae, exhibit salient crests or ridges of enlarged odontodes on the posterodorsal region of the supraoccipital and pterotic-supracleithrum bones. In O. lophophanes, O. juquiae, and O. rostrata, these odontode crests are retained in adults and the regions of the head between crests form deep depressions with growth.

Within Otothyris, O. lophophanes, O. juquiae, and O. rostrata have larger and more extensive odontode crests, more pronounced odontode ridges, larger swimbladder capsule, and larger pterotic fenestrae, in comparison with O. travassosi, which has smaller, shorter odontode crests and less pronounced ridges, a relatively small swimbladder capsule, and smaller pterotic fenestrae. Otothyris lophophanes has a single series of downturned rostral odontodes separated from a series of upturned odontodes along the dorsal rostral margin by a distinct, broad linear discontinuity, which extends laterally to a line through the anterior nares; however, in all other members of the genus, the ventral downturned odontodes comprise more than one series and are not separated from the dorsal odontodes by a broad linear discontinuity. Otothyris species also differ in tooth counts, lateral line and abdominal plates, and morphometrics.

References

Otothyrinae
Fish of South America
Fauna of Brazil
Endemic fauna of Brazil
Catfish genera
Taxa named by George S. Myers
Freshwater fish genera